John Sheridan (24 November 1933 – 13 November 2012) was an English professional rugby league footballer who played in the 1950s and 1960s, and coached in the 1970s and 1980s.

Honoured at Castleford Tigers
Sheridan is a Tigers Hall of Fame Inductee. He joined Castleford from local side Lock Lane, choosing his home town club over  Hunslet F.C.

During the early part of his career he was a strong running  who regularly topped the club's try scoring lists. After the 1958/59 season John moved into the pack, and took up the  role. He was named captain as the club began to climb the league table in the early 1960s. Injuries took a toll, and he moved into coaching. From 1964 to 1982, Sheridan was "A" team coach at Castleford, winning nine Yorkshire Senior Championships, and six Yorkshire Senior Cups. Sheridan was the coach of Castleford, his first game in charge was on 18 August 1972, and his last game in charge was on 2 May 1973, and then spent the following year at arch rivals Leeds before returning to Wheldon Road. He returned to coaching at Doncaster, and turned the club around. He was voted the most influential person in the club's history by the Dons fans.

Background
Sheridan was born in Pontefract, of Irish, and English parentage, and grew up in the Wheldon Lane area of Castleford in a large Catholic family. As part of his National Service he joined the Royal Air Force for two years, mainly working as a bar man in the officers mess, and playing Rugby Union. Once back in Castleford he signed for Castleford, and also worked in industry alongside his rugby league career.

Personal life
His marriage to Hilda (née Hunter) (birth registered during second ¼ 1934 in Pontefract district) was registered in fourth ¼ 1957 in Pontefract district The couple had two daughters; Gail M. Sheridan (birth registered during first ¼ 1959 in Pontefract district), and Ann. Also grandfather to Thomas, Julieann, Charley, Nikki, Daniel, Kay and Bryony. Great-grandad to Bethany, Ruby and Hollie-Ann.

References

External links
 Search for "Sheridan" at rugbyleagueproject.org

 Get well soon John!

1933 births
2012 deaths
Castleford Tigers captains
Castleford Tigers coaches
Castleford Tigers players
Doncaster R.L.F.C. coaches
English people of Irish descent
English rugby league coaches
English rugby league players
Leeds Rhinos coaches
Royal Air Force airmen
Rugby league centres
Rugby league locks
Rugby league players from Pontefract